This is a list of record that were produced or co-produced by Phil Spector.

Selected albums as producer (unless otherwise stated)

Top singles, peak date, and Billboard US rank

References

Spector, Phil